"It does exactly what it says on the tin" was originally an advertising slogan in the United Kingdom, which then became a common idiomatic phrase. It colloquially means that the name of something is an accurate description of its qualities. It is akin to the previously existing phrases "by name and by nature" and "it lives up to its name". It originated in a series of television advertisements by the woodstain and wood-dye manufacturer Ronseal, initiated in 1994 and still being broadcast in advertisements and online media .

The slogan was created by Liz Whiston and Dave Shelton at the London advertising agency HHCL. The idea of the phrase was to emphasise that the company's products would act and last for the amount of time exactly as described on the tin can. The word tin is generally used even when the product is sold in a different type of container, although box is also sometimes used. The expression soon entered common usage in the UK. 

The phrase is also commonly known and used in Ireland.  The Ronseal advertising campaign has also been shown there, and UK television is widely available in Ireland. In 2004, toothpaste manufacturer Colgate began a similar copycat advertising campaign in Ireland stating that its product "does exactly what it says on the tube".

The phrase is a registered trademark of the Sherwin-Williams Company, the owner of Ronseal, across the European Community for products including paints, varnishes, and wood preservatives (E3085826).

Cultural references 
In 2007, a song titled "What It Says on the Tin" was released by the British singer Katie Melua. Although the song is about relationships, the phrase has a similar meaning.

See also 
 WYSIWYG (What You See Is What You Get)

References

British culture
British advertising slogans
1994 neologisms
Colloquial terms